Association Sportive des Forces Armées Nigériennes or simply AS FAN is  a Nigerien football club based in Niamey and operated by the Nigerien Armed Forces (the FAN). They play at the stade du camp Bagagi Iya, a small stadium in one of Niamey's military bases, although larger matches are played at the stade Général Seyni Kountché. Their current club president is Army Lieutenant Colonel Djibrilla Hima Hamidou (called Colonel "Pélé").

History
ASFAN has won the Niger League Championship (today's Niger Premier League) only twice: in 1971 and 1975.

The club has reached the Coupe Nationale of Niger final only once: defeating Liberté FC  3–1 on 3 August 1995.  From this win they qualified for the 1996 Coupe de l'Union des fédérations de football ouest-africaines (UFOA Cup).  Reaching the final on 8 December 1996, ASFAN defeated East End Lions from Freetown, Sierra Leone, making them the only Nigerien football club to have won an international competition.

In 2009 they played in the Niger Premier League. They have entered the top national league every year since 2001, when they were one of fourteen clubs to boycott the championship over the relegation of Zumunta AC. In 2004 the championship was canceled.

Notable former players include Mâazou Ouwo, transferred in January 2008 to Sporting Lokeren in Belgium, who in 2009 moved to CSKA Moscow. ASFAN reportedly received 327 million FCFA for 2008 transfer fees.

In late 2008, they were chosen to compete in the 2009 African Confederation Cup in place of AS Police, who won both the Cup and League in 2008.  As no system was previously in place, the Nigerien Football Federation chose 2008 League runners up ASFAN over Akokana Arlit, 2008 Cup finalists.

Achievements

National
Niger Premier League: 5
1971, 1975, 2010, 2016, 2017.

Niger Cup: 3
1995, 2009, 2010.

Niger Super Cup: 1
2010.

Regional
West African Club Championship: 1
1996.

Performance in CAF competitions
CAF Champions League: 3 appearances
2011 – Preliminary round
2017 – Preliminary round
2018 – In progress

CAF Confederation Cup: 2 appearances
2009 – Preliminary round
2010 – Quarter-finals

References

 Niger Premier League, 2008. RSSSF Foundation.

Football clubs in Niger
Military of Niger
Super Ligue (Niger) clubs
Sport in Niamey
Military association football clubs